
Gmina Pasłęk is an urban-rural gmina (administrative district) in Elbląg County, Warmian-Masurian Voivodeship, in northern Poland.

Villages
Apart from the town of Pasłęk, Gmina Pasłęk contains the villages and settlements of: 
 
 Anglity
 Aniołowo
 Awajki
 Bądy
 Borzynowo
 Brzeziny
 Cierpkie
 Czarna Góra
 Dargowo
 Dawidy
 Drulity
 Gibity
 Gołąbki
 Gryżyna
 Gulbity
 Kajmy
 Kalinowo
 Kąty
 Kawki
 Kielminek
 Kopina
 Krasin
 Kronin
 Krosienko
 Krosno
 Krosno-Młyn
 Kudyński Bór
 Kudyny
 Kupin
 Kwitajny
 Łączna
 Leszczyna
 Leżnice
 Łukszty
 Majki
 Marianka
 Marzewo
 Nowa Wieś
 Nowe Kusy
 Nowiny
 Nowy Cieszyn
 Owczarnia
 Piniewo
 Pochylnia Kąty
 Pochylnia Nowy Całun
 Pochylnia Oleśnica
 Pólko
 Robity
 Rogajny
 Rogowo
 Rydzówka
 Rzeczna
 Rzędy
 Sakówko
 Sałkowice
 Siódmak
 Skolimowo
 Sokółka
 Stare Kusy
 Stegny
 Surowe
 Tolpity
 Tulno
 Wakarowo
 Wikrowo
 Wójtowizna
 Zielno
 Zielonka Pasłęcka
 Zielony Grąd

Neighbouring gminas
Gmina Pasłęk is bordered by the gminas of Elbląg, Godkowo, Małdyty, Milejewo, Młynary, Morąg, Rychliki and Wilczęta.

References
Polish official population figures 2006

Paslek
Elbląg County

de:Pasłęk#Gmina